The smc Pentax-DA 18-135mm f/3.5-5.6 ED AL [IF] DC WR is an APS-C standard zoom and high-end kit lens for Pentax DSLRs, introduced in September 2010. As a kit lens, it was the higher-end option for the Pentax K-5, as an alternative to the lower priced SMC Pentax-DA 18-55mm f/3.5-5.6 AL WR, and has continued in that role with subsequent Pentax DSLR models. It is also compatible with the K-01 mirrorless camera.

References
Official specifications

External links

18-135
Camera lenses introduced in 2010